Vladimir Vladilenovich Kosarev (born 4 April 1959) is a Russian former footballer who played as a midfielder or striker.

Career

Kosarev started his career with Soviet third tier side Luch. Before the 1982 season, he signed for Spartak (Moscow) in the Soviet top flight. In 1982, Kosarev was sent on loan to Soviet second tier club Spartak (Kostroma). Before the 1988 season, he returned to Luch in the Soviet third tier, where he suffered relegation to the Soviet fourth tier.  

In 1990, Kosarev signed for Cypriot top flight team Omonia Aradippou, becoming the first Russian player to play in the country.

References

External links

1959 births
Living people
Association football forwards
Association football midfielders
Cypriot First Division players
Expatriate footballers in Cyprus
FC Amur Blagoveshchensk players
FC Luch Vladivostok players
FC Shinnik Yaroslavl players
FC Spartak Kostroma players
FC Spartak Moscow players
Omonia Aradippou players
Russian expatriate footballers
Russian expatriate sportspeople in Cyprus
Russian footballers
Soviet expatriate footballers
Soviet expatriate sportspeople in Cyprus]
Soviet First League players
Soviet footballers
Soviet Second League players
Soviet Second League B players